The Kuwaiti Futsal League started in 2009 Which was inspired b Al-roudan Famous Tournemnt. The first ever Champion was Al-Yarmouk SC of the 2009-10 season.

Champions

 2009-10: Al-Yarmouk SC
 2010-11: Al-Yarmouk SC
 2011-12: Al-Salmiya SC
 2012-13: Al Qadsia SC
 2013-14: Al Qadsia SC
 2014-15: Kazma SC
 2015-16: Kazma SC
 2016-17: Kuwait SC
 2017-18: Kazma SC
 2018-19: Kuwait SC
 2019-20: Cancelled due to the COVID-19 pandemic 
 2020-21: Kuwait SC
 2021-22: Kuwait SC

References
 Kuwaiti Premier League

Futsal
1
2009 establishments in Kuwait